RAF Lilbourne is a former Royal Air Force station which was located  south of Lutterworth, Leicestershire, England.

The airfield opened 1915 before closing around 1920.

History

A number of training squadrons were based at the airfield including No. 10 Training Squadron using the Avro 504 and the Sopwith Camel at Lilbourne between 7 April 1918 and 25 June 1918,  No.44 Reserve/ Training Squadron using the Avro 504, DH4's and Royal Aircraft Factory R.E.7's based at the airfield between 2 November 1916 and 13 November 1916. This also included No. 55 Training Squadron utilising the Avro 504, Camel, Sopwith Pup and the Royal Aircraft Factory S.E.5A. The squadron used both Castle Bromwich Aerodrome and Lilbourne between 15 January 1918 and July 1918.

The airfield was also home to a number of operational squadrons during World War I including No. 55 Squadron RFC using Avro 504's, BE2's, DH4's and FK8's spread between Castle Bromwich Aerodrome and Lilbourne from 27 April 1916 and 6 March 1917, No. 73 Squadron RFC using the Camel while based at the airfield between 10 July 1917 and 9 January 1918 and No. 84 Squadron RFC using the Avro 504, Camel and Pup at Lilbourne between 23 March 1917 and 23 September 1917.

Accidents and incidents

Current use

The land is currently open land with a big lorry park on part of the airfield.

References

Military units and formations established in 1914
Royal Flying Corps airfields
Royal Air Force stations in Northamptonshire